Chatchai is the romanization of two Thai-language masculine given names:  (roughly 'umbrella of victory') and  (meaning 'male life' or 'manly'). The latter is also spelled Chartchai, among others.

Notable people with the given name  include:

Chatchai Singwangcha, Thai boxer
Chatchai-decha Butdee, Thai boxer
Chatchai Plengpanich, Thai actor
Chatchai Budprom, Thai footballer
Chatchai Koompraya, Thai footballer
Chatchai Narkwijit, Thai footballer

Notable people with the given name  include:

Chatichai Choonhavan, former prime minister
Chartchai Chionoi, professional boxer
Chartchai Ngamsan, actor
Chatchai Saengdao, footballer
Chatchai Sriworakan, Navy commander
Chartchai Tiptamai, boxer known professionally as Kongtoranee Payakaroon

Thai masculine given names